The Japanese Garden of Montevideo is located in the Prado neighbourhood of Montevideo, behind the Juan Manuel Blanes Museum.

It was donated by Japan as a memorial to the 80th anniversary of the establishment of diplomatic relations between both countries, and inaugurated on 24 September 2001 by Princess Sayako.

A wooden plaque, with calligraphy by then-Prime Minister Junichiro Koizumi, bears the inscription 平成苑 "Heisei Garden", being the year 13 of the Heisei Era (reign of Akihito) at the time of the inauguration.

See also
Buenos Aires Japanese Gardens
Shofuso Japanese House and Garden
Portland Japanese Garden
Japanese Tea Garden of San Francisco
Hammond Museum and Japanese Stroll Garden
Roji-en Japanese Gardens

References

External links

 Blog with images of the Japanese Garden
 Video of the Japanese Garden
 Blog with images of the Japanese Garden

Japanese gardens
Parks in Montevideo
Japanese immigration to Uruguay
Prado, Montevideo